Adina binti Othman, officially Datin Paduka Dayang Hajah Adina binti Othman, styled in Malay as Yang Mulia, is a Bruneian bureaucrat. She served as the Deputy Minister of Culture, Youth and Sports between 2010 and 2015 and was the first woman in Brunei to hold the position of the deputy minister.

Early life and education 
Adina is born on 31 May 1955 in Kuala Belait, Belait. She has a bachelor's degree in Southeast Asian studies and law, and a post-graduate degree in archives administration.

Political career 
Before her appointment as a Deputy Minister, Adina spent 32 years working at the Ministry of Culture, Youth and Sports. During her time at the ministry, she held a number of positions including Special Duties Officer, Head of Youth and Sport Affairs and Community Development Director. Alongside the Department of Youth and Sports, she also worked at the Museums Department.

In 2009, she received the Brunei Woman Leader in Civil Society Award. Based on her work an youth and communal development, she was appointed as Brunei's representative to the ASEAN Commission on the Promotion and Protection of the Rights of Women and Children in April 2010. Here, she represented Brunei with regards to children's rights issues. She held the position until October 2011.

Adina was appointed to the position of Deputy Minister by Sultan Hassanal Bolkiah on 29 May 2010, in a move seen as adding "new blood" to the Cabinet. She served as the acting minister for a period in 2015. Her tenure came to an end on 22 October 2015.

She has a number of articles published in peer-reviewed journals.

References 

Bruneian civil servants
Living people
Bruneian women in politics
Year of birth missing (living people)
Government ministers of Brunei
Women government ministers of Brunei